Prior to the 2019 decision by the World Anti-Doping Agency (WADA), Russia was expected to compete at the 2020 Summer Olympics in Tokyo, which took place from 23 July to 8 August 2021 because of the COVID-19 pandemic. It would have been the country's seventh consecutive appearance at the Summer Olympics as an independent nation, but their athletes were entered by and representing the "Russian Olympic Committee", using the acronym "ROC" for a country name.

This was the outcome of a decision by the World Anti-Doping Agency (WADA) on 9 December 2019 banning Russia from all international sport for four years, after it was found that data provided by the Russian Anti-Doping Agency had been manipulated by Russian authorities with a goal of protecting athletes involved in its state-sponsored doping scheme. As at the 2018 Winter Olympics, WADA would allow individual cleared Russian athletes to compete neutrally under a title to be determined (which may not include the name "Russia", unlike the use of "Olympic Athletes from Russia" in 2018).

Russia later filed an appeal to the Court of Arbitration for Sport (CAS) against the WADA decision. The Court of Arbitration for Sport, on review of Russia's appeal of its case from WADA, ruled on 17 December 2020 to reduce the penalty that WADA had placed. Instead of banning Russia from sporting events, the ruling allowed Russia to participate at the Olympics and other international events, but for a period of two years, the team cannot use the Russian name, flag, or anthem and must present themselves as "Neutral Athlete" or "Neutral Team". The ruling does allow for team uniforms to display "Russia" on the uniform as well as the use of the Russian flag colors within the uniform's design, although the name should be up to equal predominance as the "Neutral Athlete/Team" designation. Russia can appeal the decision.

On 19 February 2021, it was announced that Russia would compete under the acronym "ROC", after the name of the Russian Olympic Committee. On aftermatch, the IOC announced that the Russian national flag would be substituted by the flag of the Russian Olympic Committee. It would also be allowed to use team uniforms featuring the logo of the Russian Olympic Committee, or the acronym "ROC" would be added.

On 15 April 2021, the uniforms for the Russian Olympic Committee athletes were unveiled, featuring the colours of the Russian flag. On 22 April 2021, the replacement for Russia's anthem was approved by the IOC, after an earlier choice of the patriotic Russian war song "Katyusha" was rejected. A fragment of Pyotr Tchaikovsky's Piano Concerto No. 1 is used.

On 23 July 2021, the Russian Olympic Committee athletes appeared at the opening ceremony of the 2020 Summer Olympics. With the usage of traditional Japanese characters order, named Gojūon, ROC is not translated into Japanese script and was pronounced āru ō shī, so it placed 77th in the parade, and not as scheduled just after the Refugee Olympic Team (ai ō shī) as had been announced. Representatives of the Russian Olympic Committee did not have Japanese transcription on the back of their nametag, which was carried in front. Channel 1, which was broadcasting the ceremonies, attributed this to the inability to display the name "ROC" in Japanese characters.

The opening ceremony flag-bearers for the ROC are fencer Sofya Velikaya and volleyball player Maksim Mikhaylov. Wrestler Abdulrashid Sadulaev is the flag-bearer for the closing ceremony.

Medalists

| width=78% align=left valign=top |

|style="text-align:left; width:22%; vertical-align:top;"|

Competitors
The following is the list of number of competitors participating in the Games:

Archery

Three Russian archers qualified for the women's events by reaching the quarterfinal stage of the women's team recurve at the 2019 World Archery Championships in 's-Hertogenbosch, Netherlands.

Artistic swimming

ROC fielded a squad of eight artistic swimmers to compete in the women's duet and team events, by winning the 2019 LEN European Champions Cup.

Athletics

No more than 10 Authorised Neutral Athletes will be granted by World Athletics to the Russian Olympic Committee. On 1 May 2021, only four Russian athletes were granted this status. On 22 May 2021, 23 Russian athletes were granted this status. On 27 June 2021, 123 Russian athletes were granted this status.

Track & road events

Field events

Combined events – Men's decathlon

Badminton

Four Russian badminton players have been entered in the following events into the Olympic tournament based on the BWF Race to Tokyo Rankings.

Basketball

3×3 basketball
Summary

Men's tournament

Russia men's national 3x3 team qualified directly for the Olympics by securing an outright berth, as one of the three highest-ranked squads, in the men's category of the FIBA rankings.

Team roster
Ilia Karpenkov
Kirill Pisklov
Stanislav Sharov
Alexander Zuev

Group play

Quarterfinal

Semifinal

Gold medal match

Women's tournament

Russia women's national 3x3 team qualified directly for the Olympics by securing an outright berth, as one of the four highest-ranked squads, in the women's category of the FIBA rankings.

Team roster
Evgeniia Frolkina
Olga Frolkina
Yulia Kozik
Anastasia Logunova

Group play

Semifinal

Gold medal match

Boxing

One Russian boxer entered into the Olympic tournament: Albert Batyrgaziev scored a round-of-16 victory to secure a spot in the men's featherweight division at the 2020 European Qualification Tournament in London, United Kingdom.

Men

Women

Canoeing

Slalom
Russian canoeists qualified one boat for each of the following classes through the 2019 ICF Canoe Slalom World Championships in La Seu d'Urgell, Spain.

Sprint
Russian canoeists qualified five boats in each of the following distances for the Games through the 2019 ICF Canoe Sprint World Championships in Szeged, Hungary. Meanwhile, two additional boats were awarded to the Russian squad each in the men's K-1 200 m and women's C-2 500 m, respectively, with a top-two national finish at the 2021 European Canoe Sprint Qualifying Regatta.

Men

Women

Qualification Legend: FA = Qualify to final (medal); FB = Qualify to final B (non-medal)

Cycling

Road
ROC has entered a squad of four riders (three men and one woman) to compete in their respective Olympic road races, by virtue of their top 50 national finish (for men) and her top 100 individual finish (for women) in the UCI World Ranking.

Track
Following the completion of the 2020 UCI Track Cycling World Championships, Russian riders accumulated spots for both men and women in the team sprint, as well as the women's omnium and madison, based on their country's results in the final UCI Olympic rankings. As a result of their place in the men's and women's team sprint, Russia won its right to enter two riders in both the men's and women's sprint and men's and women's keirin.

Sprint

Team sprint

Qualification legend: FA=Gold medal final; FB=Bronze medal final

Keirin

Omnium

Madison

Mountain biking
Two Russian mountain bikers, one male and one female, qualified based on the 2019 UCI Mountain Bike World Championships and UCI Olympic Mountain Biking rankings.

BMX
Russian riders qualified for three quota place (one men and two women) for BMX at the Olympics, as a result in the UCI BMX Olympic Qualification Ranking List of 1 June 2021.

Race

Freestyle

Diving 

Russian divers qualified for five individual spots and a synchronized team at the Olympics through the 2019 FINA World Championships and the 2019 European Championships.

Men

Women

Equestrian

ROC is fielding a squad of three equestrian riders into the Olympic team dressage competition by securing an outright berth as the top-ranked nation at the International Equestrian Federation (FEI)-designated Olympic qualifier for Group C (Central and Eastern Europe) in Moscow. Meanwhile, two eventing spots were awarded to the Russian equestrians based on the results in the individual FEI Olympic rankings for Group C (Central and Eastern Europe).

The Russian equestrian team was announced on 30 June 2021.

Dressage
Maria Shuvalova and Ilyumzhinov Famous Cross have been named the traveling alternates.

Qualification Legend: Q = Qualified for the final; q = Qualified for the final as a lucky loser

Eventing

Fencing

Russian fencers qualified a full squad each in the men's and women's team foil, women's team épée, and women's team sabre at the Games by finishing among the top four nations in the FIE Olympic Team Rankings, while the remaining men's teams claimed the spot each as the highest-ranked nation from Europe outside the world's top four.

Men

Women

Gymnastics

Artistic
ROC are fielding a full squad of four gymnasts each in both the men's and women's artistic gymnastics events by virtue of a top three finish in the team all-around at the 2018 World Artistic Gymnastics Championships in Doha, Qatar. Both teams were announced on 10 June 2021.

Men
Team

Individual

Women
Team

Individual

Rhythmic 
ROC qualified a squad of rhythmic gymnasts for the group all-around by virtue of a top-three finish at the 2018 World Championships in Sofia, Bulgaria. Two more rhythmic gymnasts were added to the roster by finishing in the top sixteen of the individual all-around at the 2019 World Championships in Baku, Azerbaijan.

Trampoline
ROC qualified one gymnast each for the men's and women's trampoline by finishing in the top eight, respectively, at the 2019 World Championships in Tokyo, Japan. They qualified an additional spot for the men's and women's trampoline during the 2019–2020 Trampoline World Cup series.

Handball

Summary

Women's tournament

ROC's handball team qualified for the Olympics by securing a top-two finish at the Győr leg of the 2020 IHF Olympic Qualification Tournament.

Team roster

Group play

Quarterfinal

Semifinal

Gold medal game

Judo

Men

Women

Mixed

Karate
 
One Russian karateka entered into the inaugural Olympic tournament: Anna Chernysheva qualified directly for the women's kumite 55 kg category by finishing top three at 2021 World Olympic Qualification Tournament in Paris, France.

Modern pentathlon
 
Russian athletes qualified for the following spots in the modern pentathlon at the Games. Alexander Lifanov and Adelina Ibatullina confirmed places each in the men's and women's event, respectively, with the former and the latter finishing seventh among those eligible for Olympic qualification at the 2019 European Championships in Bath, England.

Rowing

ROC qualified seven boats for each of the following rowing classes into the Olympic regatta. Rowing crews in the women's single sculls and women's lightweight double sculls confirmed Olympic places for their boats at the 2021 FISA European Olympic Qualification Regatta in Varese, Italy. Meanwhile, four more crews (men's single sculls, men's double sculls, women's double sculls, and women's pair) were added to the Russian roster with their top-two finish at the 2021 FISA Final Qualification Regatta in Lucerne, Switzerland.

Men

Women

Qualification Legend: FA=Final A (medal); FB=Final B (non-medal); FC=Final C (non-medal); FD=Final D (non-medal); FE=Final E (non-medal); FF=Final F (non-medal); SA/B=Semifinals A/B; SC/D=Semifinals C/D; SE/F=Semifinals E/F; QF=Quarterfinals; R=Repechage

Rugby sevens

Summary

Women's tournament
The Russian women's rugby sevens team qualified by securing a spot in the final repechage tournament on 20 June 2021.

Team roster
 Women's team event – 1 team of 12 players
Squad

Group play

Group stage

Quarterfinal

5–8th place semifinal

Seventh place match

Sailing

Russian sailors qualified one boat in each of the following classes through the 2018 Sailing World Championships, the class-associated Worlds, and the continental regattas.

M = Medal race; EL = Eliminated – did not advance into the medal race

Shooting

Russian shooters achieved quota places for the following events by virtue of their best finishes at the 2018 ISSF World Championships, the 2019 ISSF World Cup series, European Championships or Games, and European Qualifying Tournament, as long as they obtained a minimum qualifying score (MQS) by May 31, 2020.

Men

Women

Mixed

Sport climbing

ROC has entered three sport climbers into the Olympic tournament. Iuliia Kaplina qualified directly for the women's combined event, by finishing in the top six of those eligible for qualification at the 2019 IFSC World Olympic Qualifying Event in Toulouse, France. Meanwhile, Viktoria Meshkova and Alexey Rubtsov completed the Russian sport climbing roster for the rescheduled Games, by winning the gold medal and securing an outright berth at the 2020 IFSC European Championships in Moscow.

Swimming

Russian swimmers further achieved qualifying standards in the following events (up to a maximum of 2 swimmers in each event at the Olympic Qualifying Time (OQT), and potentially 1 at the Olympic Selection Time (OST)): To assure their selection to the Olympic team, swimmers must finish in the top two of each individual event with the federation's corresponding standard slightly faster than the FINA A-cut at the Russian Championships & Olympic Trials (April 3 to 9) in Kazan.

Thirty-three swimmers (19 men and 14 women) were selected to the Russian roster at the end of the trials, with the Olympic medalists Anastasia Fesikova (women's backstroke double) and Yuliya Yefimova (women's breaststroke double) racing in the pool at their fourth consecutive Games. Notable swimmers also featured the reigning world champions Evgeny Rylov in the men's backstroke double, world-record holder Anton Chupkov in the men's breaststroke double, Youth Olympic champions Andrey Minakov (sprint freestyle and butterfly) and junior world-record holder Kliment Kolesnikov (sprint freestyle and backstroke), and freestyle veteran and London 2012 bronze medalist Vladimir Morozov.

Men

Women

Mixed

 Swimmers who participated in the heats only.

Table tennis

Three Russian athletes have been entered into the table tennis competition at the Games. Rio 2016 Olympian Polina Mikhailova scored a third-match final triumph to secure one of the five available places in the women's singles, while Kirill Skachkov notched the last of four men's singles spots with a repechage final victory at the 2021 ITTF World Qualification Tournament in Doha, Qatar. Meanwhile, London 2012 Olympian Yana Noskova rounded out the nation's roster by winning the third-stage final match at the European Qualification Tournament in Odivelas, Portugal.

Taekwondo

Four ROC athletes have been entered into the taekwondo competition at the Games. Mikhail Artamonov (men's 58 kg), Maksim Khramtsov (men's 80 kg), defending world champion Vladislav Larin (men's +80 kg), and Tatiana Kudashova (women's 57 kg) qualified directly for their respective weight classes by finishing among the top five taekwondo practitioners at the end of the World Taekwondo Olympic Rankings.

Tennis

ROC has entered eight tennis players (four men and four women) into the Olympic tournament. Daniil Medvedev (world no. 2), Andrey Rublev (world no. 7), Aslan Karatsev (world no. 24), and Karen Khachanov (world no. 25) qualified directly for the men's singles as four of the top 58 eligible players in the ATP World Rankings, while Anastasia Pavlyuchenkova (world no. 19), Veronika Kudermetova (world no. 33), Ekaterina Alexandrova (world no. 34), and Elena Vesnina (former world no. 13, replace for world no. 31 Daria Kasatkina after Daria withdrew in 15 July) did so for the women's singles based on their WTA World Rankings as of 24 June 2021.

In women's doubles, the reigning Olympic champion Vesnina partnered Kudermetova. In men's doubles, Karatsev and Medvedev, Khachanov and Rublev partnered each other. In mixed double, Karatsev and Rublev took turns pairing with Vesnina and Pavlyuchenkova.

Men

Women

Mixed

Triathlon

Relay

Volleyball

Beach
Russian men's beach volleyball pair qualified for the Olympics by winning the gold medal and securing an outright berth at the 2019 FIVB World Championships in Hamburg, Germany.

Indoor
Summary

Men's tournament

The Russian men's volleyball team qualified for the Olympics by securing an outright berth as the highest-ranked nation for pool E at the Intercontinental Olympic Qualification Tournament in Saint Petersburg.

Team roster

Group play

Quarterfinal

Semifinal

Gold medal match

Women's tournament

Russia women's volleyball team qualified for the Olympics by securing an outright berth as the highest-ranked nation for pool E at the Intercontinental Olympic Qualification Tournament in Kaliningrad.

Team roster

Group play

Quarterfinal

Water polo

Summary

Women's tournament

The ROC women's water polo team qualified for the Olympics by advancing to the final match and securing an outright berth at the 2020 European Championships in Budapest, Hungary.

Team roster

Group play

Quarterfinal

Semifinal

Bronze medal game

Weightlifting

After the International Weightlifting Federation imposed restrictions on the number of team places available to Russian athletes following large numbers of anti-doping rule violations failures by Russian weightlifters in the ten years preceding the 2020 Summer Olympics, only two athletes were permitted to represent Russia (one male athlete and one female athlete). The Russian Olympic Committee selected Kristina Sobol and Timur Naniev.

Wrestling

ROC qualified seventeen wrestlers for each of the following classes into the Olympic competition. Nine of them finished among the top six to book Olympic spots in the men's freestyle (all classes except 125 kg), men's Greco-Roman (60, 67 and 97 kg), and women's freestyle 50 kg at the 2019 World Championships, while four additional licenses were awarded to the Russian wrestlers, who progressed to the top two finals of their respective weight categories at the 2021 European Qualification Tournament in Budapest, Hungary. Four Russian wrestlers claimed one of the remaining slots in the men's freestyle 125 kg and women's freestyle events (53, 57, & 62 kg) to complete the nation's roster at the 2021 World Qualification Tournament in Sofia, Bulgaria.

Freestyle

Greco-Roman

References

Nations at the 2020 Summer Olympics
2020
2021 in Russian sport